On 2 July 2005, a Live 8 concert was held in Philadelphia, Pennsylvania, United States, in front of the Philadelphia Museum of Art, with a densely packed audience stretched out for one mile along the Benjamin Franklin Parkway.  The event was organized by the ONE Campaign.

It was one of the first Live 8 concerts announced, as the city had played host to its Live Aid predecessor in 1985, and, until the inclusion of a concert outside Toronto, was the only city in North America to represent Live 8.  It did, however, remain the only United States city to participate in the event.

The event is also referred to as "Live 8 Philadelphia", "Live 8 Philly", or "Live 8 USA".

Unlike other venues, no tickets were issued to control access, and Philadelphia police declined to give a crowd estimate.  Presenters stated several times on stage that over one million people were at the concert.
Non-organizer estimates ranged from 600,000 to 800,000 and one million to 1.5 million. Some estimates are of the number of people at the concert at any one time, while other estimates are of the total number of people on the Parkway over the course of the nearly eight hours-long event.

Lineup
All times EDT

Performance notes

Several artists mentioned or dedicated performances to Luther Vandross who had died the day before.

The show managed to expose fault in the SEPTA Regional Rail system, which is the commuter rail portion of the city's mass transit system, SEPTA.  Trains to and from the concert were overcrowded and many had to ignore departure times in order to accommodate the unprecedented influx of passengers using the system at one time.

Two days after the concert, Elton John gave a free concert on the same stage used for Live 8, as part of the city's Independence Day celebrations.

Pre-show news and rumours
Live 8 producer/promoter Russell Simmons was the man responsible for adding more African-American artists to the Live 8 Philadelphia bill, including some Def Poetry Jam poets.

After noticing the lack of hip-hop artists on the bill, Bono called Jay-Z and Mike Shinoda of Linkin Park personally and asked them to perform in Philadelphia. 50 Cent, Justin Timberlake, Usher, and Sean Combs were also originally scheduled to perform but cancelled due to scheduling conflicts.

Despite suspicions that the show's finale would consist of a new rendition of the USA for Africa hit "We Are the World", which was performed at the Philadelphia show 20 years earlier at Live Aid, it did not.

Also, rumors circulated in the crowd that Bruce Springsteen would close the show.

Coverage

In the United States, MTV and VH1 provided intermittent and incomplete live and taped coverage, frequently breaking away mid-song for commercials or commentary by their veejays.  ABC provided a short highlights program that evening.

In the United Kingdom, BBC One aired highlights after the full coverage of the London show. Furthermore, BBC Three aired further highlights the following evening. Clair Brothers Audio Systems and Franklin Simon Productions were responsible for providing the live sound reinforcement for Live 8 Philadelphia. Electric Factory Concerts was also involved in the production. Clair Brothers also provided the live sound reinforcement for Live 8 London. The remaining venues were handled by local sound reinforcement companies.

AOL also provided a webcast of the entire show as it happened and carried webcasts of almost all of the Live 8 shows.

References

Live 8 Philadelphia exclusive website.
Live 8 photo gallery.

Live 8 events
2005 in American music
2005 in Pennsylvania
2005 in Philadelphia
Museums in popular culture
July 2005 events in the United States